The 2010 Alabama Crimson Tide softball team was an American softball team, representing the University of Alabama for the 2010 NCAA softball season. The Crimson Tide played its home games at the Alabama Softball Complex. The 2010 club made the postseason for the 12th straight year.

Previous season
The 2009 Crimson Tide went 52-9 overall and 21-6 in SEC play. They were named the #4 overall seed in the NCAA tournament, advanced to the semifinals of the Women's College World Series. Three Tide players were named All-Americans (center fielder Brittany Rogers, pitcher/firstbaseman Charlotte Morgan and pitcher Kelsi Dunne).

Pre-season
The Tide returns 13 letterwinners from a team that equaled its longest stay at the Women's College World Series in program history last season. All-Americans Morgan and Dunne return to the fold to lead Alabama in the 2010 season. On January 16, 2010, the Crimson Tide held their first official practice.

Schedule 

|-
!colspan=9| Hatter Invitational

|-
!colspan=9|

|-
!colspan=9| NFCA Leadoff Classic

|-
!colspan=9| Easton Classic

|-
!colspan=9|

|-
!colspan=9| SEC Tournament

|-
!colspan=9| NCAA Tuscaloosa Regional

|-
!colspan=9| NCAA Tuscaloosa Super Regional

Ranking Movement

References

2010 Southeastern Conference softball season
Alabama Crimson Tide softball seasons
Alabama
2010 NCAA Division I softball tournament participants